Eric Norman Thompson (9 November 1929 – 30 November 1982) was an English actor, scriptwriter and stage director. He is best remembered for creating and performing the English narration for The Magic Roundabout, which he adapted from the original French Le Manège enchanté.

Early life
Eric Norman Thompson was born on 9 November 1929 in Sleaford, Lincolnshire, England, the son of Annie (née Jackson) and George Henry Thompson, a hotel waiter, and grew up in Rudgwick, Sussex, attending Collyer's School, Horsham. He trained to be an actor at the Old Vic acting school in London and joined the Old Vic theatre company in 1952.

Career
Thompson worked regularly for the BBC, and was a presenter of the children's television programme Play School from 1964 to 1967. He was best known as the narrator of The Magic Roundabout, for which he also wrote the English language scripts, using the visuals from the original French Le Manège enchanté. These were transmitted from October 1965 to January 1977. Thompson rarely worked in television after his voice became well-known, but occasionally appeared in programmes including Doctor Finlay's Casebook (episode: "Beware of the Dog"), Doctor Who in the serial The Massacre of St Bartholomew's Eve in 1966, and in two episodes of Coronation Street, in 1964 and 1969 (playing two different characters).

Personal life and death
Thompson married Scottish actress Phyllida Law, whom he met while at the Old Vic in 1957. Their daughters Emma and Sophie Thompson followed into acting.

In 1967, he had a heart attack, resulting from overwork and heavy smoking, and therefore changed his focus to directing. He directed Kenneth Williams in My Fat Friend in 1972 and the conflicts between the two are extensively discussed in Williams' diaries.

On 30 November 1982, Thompson died of a heart attack in London.

Filmography

References

External links

1929 births
1982 deaths
English male television actors
English television presenters
English television producers
English male voice actors
People educated at The College of Richard Collyer
People from Sleaford, Lincolnshire
People from Rudgwick
Male actors from Lincolnshire
20th-century English male actors
BBC television presenters